Lakin is a city in and the county seat of Kearny County, Kansas, United States.  As of the 2020 census, the population of the city was 2,205.

History
Lakin was founded in 1874. It was named for David Long Lakin, former treasurer of the Atchison, Topeka and Santa Fe Railway.

A post office has been in operation in Lakin since March 1874. Lakin was designated county seat in 1888.

Geography

Climate

Demographics

2010 census
As of the census of 2010, there were 2,216 people, 781 households, and 573 families residing in the city. The racial makeup of the city was 87.7% White, 0.3% African American, 0.9% Native American, 8.7% from other races, and 2.4% from two or more races. Hispanic or Latino of any race were 28.9% of the population.

There were 781 households, of which 43.0% had children under the age of 18 living with them, 54.9% were married couples living together, 11.8% had a female householder with no husband present, 6.7% had a male householder with no wife present, and 26.6% were non-families. 24.2% of all households were made up of individuals, and 11.2% had someone living alone who was 65 years of age or older. The average household size was 2.73 and the average family size was 3.23.

The median age in the city was 34.5 years. 30.1% of residents were under the age of 18; 8.8% were between the ages of 18 and 24; 23.1% were from 25 to 44; 23.6% were from 45 to 64; and 14.5% were 65 years of age or older. The gender makeup of the city was 50.6% male and 49.4% female.

2000 census
As of the census of 2000, there were 2,316 people, 823 households, and 604 families residing in the city. The racial makeup of the city was 81.56% White, 0.82% African American, 1.34% Native American, 0.35% Asian, 14.16% from other races, and 1.77% from two or more races. Hispanic or Latino of any race were 24.96% of the population.

There were 823 households, out of which 42.3% had children under the age of 18 living with them, 59.2% were married couples living together, 10.1% had a female householder with no husband present, and 26.5% were non-families. 24.1% of all households were made up of individuals, and 10.6% had someone living alone who was 65 years of age or older. The average household size was 2.80 and the average family size was 3.32.

In the city, the population was spread out, with 34.2% under the age of 18, 8.9% from 18 to 24, 28.1% from 25 to 44, 18.3% from 45 to 64, and 10.6% who were 65 years of age or older. The median age was 32 years. For every 100 females, there were 101.9 males. For every 100 females age 18 and over, there were 93.5 males.

The median income for a household in the city was $38,875, and the median income for a family was $44,688. Males had a median income of $31,086 versus $20,433 for females. The per capita income for the city was $15,531. About 6.9% of families and 10.4% of the population were below the poverty line, including 15.3% of those under age 18 and 6.1% of those age 65 or over.

Education
The community is served by Lakin USD 215 public school district.

Gallery

Notable people
 Frank Luther (1899–1980), country music singer
Russ Jennings, member of the Kansas House of Representatives

See also
 Santa Fe Trail
 List of battles fought in Kansas

References

Further reading

External links

 City of Lakin
 Lakin - Directory of Public Officials
 USD 215, local school district
 Lakin city map, KDOT

Cities in Kansas
County seats in Kansas
Cities in Kearny County, Kansas
1874 establishments in Kansas
Populated places established in 1874